Jiří Kodet (6 December 1937 – 25 June 2005) was a Czech actor. He appeared in more than ninety films between 1951 and 2003. His mother Jiřina Steimarová and his daughter Barbora Kodetová are also actresses.

Selected filmography

References

External links
 

1937 births
2005 deaths
Czech male stage actors
Czech male film actors
Czech male television actors
Male actors from Prague
20th-century Czech male actors
21st-century Czech male actors
Czech Lion Awards winners